Stéphane Kingué Mpondo (born June 2, 1985 in Bafoussam, Cameroon) is a professional Cameroonian footballer currently playing for Azam.

Career
He previously played for Cotonsport Garoua before signing a three-year contract with Ashdod in September 2009.

International statistics
Statistics accurate as of 30 January 2016.

References

1985 births
Living people
Cameroonian footballers
Cameroonian expatriate footballers
Coton Sport FC de Garoua players
Association football midfielders
F.C. Ashdod players
Expatriate footballers in Israel
Expatriate footballers in Kazakhstan
Cameroon A' international footballers
2016 African Nations Championship players
Cameroonian expatriate sportspeople in Kazakhstan
Cameroonian expatriate sportspeople in Israel
Cameroonian expatriate sportspeople in Tanzania
Expatriate footballers in Tanzania
Azam F.C. players